The Letter: A Message for our Earth is a 2022 documentary film presented by YouTube Originals, telling the story of the Laudato Si' encyclical by Pope Francis.

The film was produced by Oscar-winning Off The Fence Productions and directed by Nicolas Brown, in partnership with the Laudato Si' Movement.

Its global premiere happened in Vatican City on 4 October 2022. High-level speakers such as Hoesung Lee, Director of the Intergovernmental Panel on Climate Change, and Cardinal Michael Czerny, Prefect of the Dicastery for Integral Human Development, spoke in the premiere's press conference.

The film was an instant success amassing over 7 million views in its first two weeks, with the support of celebrities such as Leonardo DiCaprio and Arnold Schwarzenegger who promoted it on their social media accounts.

Plot
Besides starring Pope Francis, the film features environmental champions from around the world, from different faiths and worldviews. Each represents an unheard voice in conversations on the planetary crisis. These are the voices of the Indigenous, the young, the poor, and wildlife. 

The film follows their journeys from the Amazon, India, Senegal, and Hawai’i to the Vatican. They meet Pope Francis, who shares his vision in beautifully human interactions. They find new hope for Earth in one another.

Cast
 Pope Francis
 Raniero Cantalamessa
 Lorna Gold
 Ridhima Pandey
 Arouna Kande
 Cacique Dadá
 Greg Asner
 Robin Martin

References

External links
 The Letter official website
 The Letter official trailer
 The Letter full film
 

2022 films
2022 documentary films
Films about popes
Works about Pope Francis
Climate change films